(also written 2013 BS45) is a horseshoe companion to the Earth like 3753 Cruithne. Like Cruithne, it does not orbit the Earth in the normal sense and at times it is on the other side of the Sun, yet it still periodically comes nearer to the Earth in sort of halo orbit before again drifting away. While not a traditional natural satellite, it does not quite have normal heliocentric orbit either and these are sometimes called quasi-satellties or horseshoe orbits.

Discovery, orbit and physical properties 

 was discovered by James V. Scotti on 20 January 2013, observing for the Spacewatch project from Kitt Peak (KPNO). Its orbit is characterized by low eccentricity (0.084), low inclination (0.77º) and a semi-major axis of 0.993 AU; it is the most Earth-like among those of asteroids moving in Earth-like orbits. Upon discovery, it was classified as an Aten asteroid but also an Earth crosser by the Minor Planet Center. Its orbit is well determined; as of 26 August 2015, its orbit is based on 96 observations spanning a data-arc of 375 days.  has an absolute magnitude of 25.9 which gives a characteristic diameter of 30 m. Radar observations indicate that it may be a very rapid rotator with a period of just a few minutes.

Horseshoe companion to the Earth and orbital evolution 

Recent calculations indicate that it follows a horseshoe orbit with respect to the Earth. Its orbital evolution is highly chaotic and its orbit is difficult to predict beyond a few thousand years. As for the available data, it had its closest encounter ever with Earth on 12 February 2013 at 0.013 AU, closer than in 1934, the previously closest approach at 0.014 AU. The next approach closer than 0.020 AU will take place on 2 September 2090 at 0.016 AU.
Its orbit matches the expected properties of that of an object in the Arjuna class.

Origin 
 may have originated within the Venus-Earth-Mars region; alternatively, it may have come from the main asteroid belt like other Near-Earth Objects, then transitioned to an Amor-class asteroid before entering Earth's co-orbital region.

See also 
 3753 Cruithne
 
 
 
 
 
 
 
 Orbital resonance

Notes 

  This is assuming an albedo of 0.20–0.04.

References 
 

Further reading
 A resonant family of dynamically cold small bodies in the near-Earth asteroid belt de la Fuente Marcos, Carlos; de la Fuente Marcos, Raúl (2013), Monthly Notices of the Royal Astronomical Society: Letters, Vol. 434, Issue 1, pp. L1-L5.
 Geometric characterization of the Arjuna orbital domain de la Fuente Marcos, Carlos; de la Fuente Marcos, Raúl (2015), Astronomische Nachrichten, Vol. 336, Issue 1, pp. 5–22.

External links 
  data at MPC
 MPEC 2013-B72 : 2013 BS45 (Discovery MPEC)
  Goldstone Radar Observations Planning
  imaged by the Palomar Transient Factory survey
 The “Horseshoe” Orbit of Near-Earth Object  by D. R. Adamo
 
 
 

Minor planet object articles (unnumbered)

Earth-crossing asteroids

20130120